Dassa may refer to:
James Dassa, Mayor of Antwerp 
Dassa-Zoumé, Benin
Dassa, Burkina Faso